Rosemary is a feminine given name, a combination of the names Rose which is a flower that belongs to the Rose family. and from the nameMary which is the name of the Virgin Mary and means Strong, Fertile. It can also be used in reference to the herb named rosemary. Rosemary has been in steady use in the United States and has ranked among the top 1,000 for 110 years. It was ranked as the 754th most popular name for American girls born in 1992. Its greatest period of popularity in the United States was between 1925 and 1950, when it was ranked among the top 150 names for girls. Rosemarie is another variant, and Romy is a German nickname for the name. 

Notable persons with the name include:
Rosemary A. Bailey (born 1947), British statistician
Rosemary A. Stevens (born 1935), historian of American medicine and health policy
Rosemary Aitken (born 1942), English author
Rosemary Altea (born 1946), British author
Rosemary Anne Sisson (1923-2017), English television dramatist and novelist
Rosemary Ashe (born 1953), English stage actress and classically trained opera singer
Rosemary Ashton (born 1947), British literary scholar
Rosemary Askin (born 1949), New Zealand geologist
Rosemary Aubert (born 1946), Canadian-American author, poet, and critic
Rosemary Bailey (author) (born 1953), British writer
Rosemary Banks (born 1951), former New Zealand diplomat
Rosemary Barkett (born 1939), Judge of the Iran–United States Claims Tribunal
Rosemary Barnett, British sculptor
Rosemary Barrow (1968-2016), art historian
Rosemary Barton (born 1976), Canadian political journalist
Rosemary Beresford, American figure skater
Rosemary Biggs (1912-2001), English haematologist
Rosemary Blight, Australian film producer
Rosemary Brown (disambiguation), various people
Rosemary Bryant Mariner (1953–2019), American female military aviator
Rosemary Butler, American singer
Rosemary Butler (politician) (born 1943), British politician
Rosemary Byrne (born 1948), Scottish politician and co-convenor of Solidarity
Rosemary Campbell (born 1944), New Zealand painter
Rosemary Candlin (born 1927), computer scientist
Rosemary Carter, writer
Rosemary Casals (born 1948), former American professional tennis player
Rosemary Catacalos, 2013 poet laureate of Texas
Rosemary Church (born 1962), British journalist
Rosemary Clement-Moore, American author
Rosemary Clooney (1928–2002), American singer
Rosemary Conley (born 1946), English businesswoman, author, and broadcaster on exercise and health
Rosemary Corbin, longstanding Democratic public figure and former mayor of Richmond, California
Rosemary Cove (born 1936), American sculptor
Rosemary Cramp (born 1929), British archaeologist
Rosemary Crossley (born 1945), Australian author and advocate for disability rights and facilitated communication
Rosemary Crowley (born 1938), former Labor Senator for South Australia
Rosemary Davies (1903-1963), American actress
Rosemary De Angelis (1933–2020), American stage, screen, and television actress
Rosemary DeCamp (1910–2001), American actress
Rosemary Dempsey, former Vice President of The National Organization of Women
Rosemary Dexter (1944-2010), Italian film actress
Rosemary DiCarlo (born 1947), American diplomat
Rosemary Dinnage (1928-2015), British author and critic
Rosemary Dobson (1920-2012), Australian poet, illustrator, editor, and anthologist
Rosemary Dunleavy, American ballet dancer
Rosemary Dunsmore (born 1953), Canadian actress
Rosemary E. Rodriguez, State Director for Senator Michael Bennet of Colorado
Rosemary Eames (1965–2002), Australian swimmer with one arm
Rosemary Edghill (born 1956), American writer and editor
Rosemary Edmonds (1905-1998), British translator of Russian literature
Rosemary Edna Sinclair (born 1936), Australian environmental and children's rights activist
Rosemary Ellen Guiley (1950–2019), American writer and radio show host
Rosemary Esehagu (born 1981), Nigerian writer
Rosemary Fadljevic (born 1993), Australian basketball player
Rosemary Feit Covey (born 1954), American printmaker
Rosemary Firth (1912-2001), British social anthropologist, and Sir Raymond Firth's wife
Rosemary Follett (born 1948), Australian politician
Rosemary Foot (politician) (born 1936), former Australian politician
Rosemary Foot (academic) (born 1948), Professor of International Relations and the John Swire Senior research Fellow in International Relations, St. Antony's College, Oxford
Rosemary Forbes Kerry (1913-2002), American nurse, social activist, and John Forbes Kerry's mother
Rosemary Forsyth (born 1943), Canadian-born American actress and model
Rosemary Frankau (1933-2017), British actress
Rosemary Georgeson, Coast Salish and Sahtu Dene filmmaker and multi-media artist
Rosemary Gill (1930–2011), British children's television producer for the BBC
Rosemary Gillespie (1941-2010), Australian lawyer, human rights activist, author, and film producer
Rosemary Gillespie (biologist), American evolutionary biologist
Rosemary Gilliat (1919-2004), Canadian photojournalist
Rosemary Gladstar, American herbalist
Rosemary Glyde (1948-1994), American violist and composer
Rosemary Godin, former Canadian politician and current writer and Christian minister
Rosemary Goldie (1916-2010), Australian Roman Catholic theologian
Rosemary Goodchild (born 1936), English former cricketer
Rosemary R. Gunning (1905–1997), American politician
Rosemary Hall (political activist) (1925-2011), Scottish political organiser
Rosemary Harris (born 1927), British actress
Rosemary Harris (writer) (1923–2019), British author
Rosemary Hayes (born 1942), British author
Rosemary Hennessy (born 1950), American professor
Rosemary Hill (born 1957), British historian
Rosemary Hinkfuss (1931-2016), American former Wisconsin State Assembly member, and Green Bay Packers Board of Directors member
Rosemary Hollis, British political scientist
Rosemary Homeister Jr. (born 1972), American jockey in thoroughbred horse racing
Rosemary Horrox (born 1951), English historian
Rosemary Hughes, royal florist of Queen Elizabeth II
Rosemary Hume (1907-1984), British cook and writer
Rosemary Hunter, Australian academic
Rosemary Hutton (1925-2004), British geophysicist and pioneer of magnetotellurics
Rosemary Huxtable, senior Australian public servant
Rosemary Jeffries, President of Georgian Court University, and Vice Chair of the New Jersey Presidents' Council Executive Board
Rosemary Jenkinson (born 1967), Irish poet, playwright, and short story writer
Rosemary Johnson (1913-1972), British actress
Rosemary Joshua (born 1964), Welsh soprano
Rosemary Joy Hendry (born 1945), British cultural anthropologist
Rosemary Joyce (born 1956), American anthropologist and social archaeologist
Rosemary Kennedy (1918-2005), oldest daughter of Joseph, Sr. and Rose Fitzgerald Kennedy, and a sister of President John F. Kennedy, and Senators Robert F. Kennedy and Ted Kennedy
Rosemary Kilbourn (born 1931), Canadian printmaker
Rosemary Kirstein, American science fiction writer
Rosemary Kuhlmann (1922–2019), American operatic mezzo-soprano and Broadway musical actress
Rosemary Kurtz (1930–2017), American educator and politician
Rosemary Kyburz (born 1944), Australian member of the Queensland State Parliament (1974–1983) as the Liberal Member for Salisbury
Rosemary Laing (born 1959), Australian photographer
Rosemary LaPlanche (1923-1979), Miss America in 1941
Rosemary Lauder, English historian
Rosemary Lain-Priestley (born 1967), Church of England priest
Rosemary Lassig (1941-2017), Australian breaststroke swimmer
Rosemary Leach (1935-2017), British stage, television, and film actress
Rosemary Lehmberg (born 1949), American attorney
Rosemary Lenton (born 1949), Scottish para-bowler and wheelchair curler
Rosemary Leona, businesswoman from Vanuatu
Rosemary Leonard (born 1956), British general practitioner and journalist
Rosemary Little (born 1982), Australian Paralympic athlete
Rosemary Low, British aviculturist, ornithologist, conservationist, writer, and parrot expert
Rosemary Lowe-McConnell (1921-2014), English ichthyologist, ecologist, and limnologist
Rosemary M. Collyer (born 1945),  Senior United States District Judge of the United States District Court for the District of Columbia, and a United States Foreign Intelligence Surveillance Court member
Rosemary M. Wixom (born 1948), former general president of the Primary of The Church of Jesus Christ of Latter-day Saints
Rosemary Madigan (1926–2019), Australian sculptor, stonecarver and woodcarver
Rosemary Mahoney (born 1961), American non-fiction writer
Rosemary Manning (1911-1988), British author
Rosemary Marcus, female Nigerian professional cyclist
Rosemary Márquez (born 1968), Judge of the United States District Court for the District of Arizona
Rosemary Martin (1936-1998), English actress
Rosemary Mayer (1943–2014), American visual artist
Rosemary McAuliffe (born 1940), American Democratic politician
Rosemary McKenna (born 1941), Scottish Labour Party politician
Rosemary McLeod (born 1949), New Zealand writer
Rosemary Menkens (born 1946), Australian politician
Rosemary Milgate (born 1959), Australian former swimmer
Rosemary Morris (born 1986), British water polo player
Rosemary Mulligan (1941-2014), member of the Illinois House of Representatives from the 65th district
Rosemary Murphy (1925–2014), American actress 
Rosemary Murray (1913–2004), British chemist 
  (also known as Rosemary or Rosemary Belkiss, born 1947), Brazilian singer
Rosemary Museminali (born 1962), Rwandan politician and diplomat
Rosemary Neering (born 1945), Canadian author and journalist
Rosemary Nelson (1958-1999), Irish human rights solicitor
Rosemary Nicols (born 1941), British actress
Rosemary Nixon, Canadian author and novelist
Rosemary O'Day,  professor emeritus of history at Open University
Rosemary Odinga (born 1977), Kenyan entrepreneur, advocate for alternative agriculture, and proponent of social equality
Rosemary Okafor (born 1981), Nigerian sprinter
Rosemary O'Leary, Edwin O. Stene Distinguished Professor of Public Administration at the University of Kansas
Rosemary Opala (1923–2008), Australian artist, writer, and nurse
Rosemary Owens, Australian Dean of Law at the University of Adelaide Law School
Rosemary Park (1907-2004), American scholar, academic leader, and advocate for women's education
Rosemary Pattenden, British Emeritus Professor of University of East Anglia
Rosemary Payne (born 1933), British female discus thrower
Rosemary Pollock (1944–2022), British writer
Rosemary Potter (born 1952), American former Wisconsin State Assembly member
Rosemary Pratt, Marchioness Camden (1921-2004), British socialite and artist, best known as Group Captain Peter Townsend's first wife
Rosemary Prinz (born 1930), stage and television actress
Rosemary Quispe (born 1983), Bolivian long distance runner
Rosemary R. Haggett, American Vice Chancellor for Academic Affairs and Student Success for the University of North Texas System
Rosemary Radcliffe (born 1949), Canadian comic actress, writer, composer, and painter
Rosemary Radford Ruether (1936–2022), American feminist scholar and Catholic theologian
Rosemary Rapaport (1918-2011), English violinist and music teacher
Rosemary Redfield, Canadian microbiologist at the University of British Columbia
Rosemary Reed Miller (1939-2017), American business owner and historian
Rosemary Ribeiro (born 1958), former international butterfly swimmer from Brazil
Rosemary Rice (1925-2012), American actress, singer, and voice-over artist
Rosemary Riddell, actor, film director, and Family Court judge from New Zealand
Rosemary Roberts, American statistics educator
Rosemary Rodriguez, film and television director
Rosemary Rogers (1932–2019), American author
Rosemary Rue (1928-2004), British physician and civil servant
Rosemary S. Pooler (born 1938), American judge
Rosemary Sage, British academic
Rosemary Sandlin (born 1946), American politician
Rosemary Sassoon (born 1931), English handwriting expert
Rosemary Sayigh (born 1935), British-born journalist and scholar of Middle Eastern history
Rosemary Seninde (born 1965), Ugandan educator and politician
Rosemary Sexton (born 1946), Canadian author and former columnist
Rosemary Shrager (born 1951), British chef
Rosemary Siemens, violinist and singer
Rosemarie Sonora (born 1948), Filipino actress
Lady Rosemary Spencer-Churchill, maid of honour to Queen Elizabeth II
Rosemary Squire (born 1956), English theatre producer
Rosemary Squires (born 1928), international jazz, big band, cabaret and concert singer, and recording artist
Rosemary Llanchie Stevenson, African-American ballet dancer
Rosemary Sutcliff (1920-1992), English novelist
Rosemary Theby (1892-1973), American film actress
Rosemary Thomas (1901-1961), American poet
Rosemary Thompson (born 1964), Director of Communications for Canada's National Arts Centre
Rosemary Thomson, Canadian conductor and chorus master
Rosemary Timperley (1920–1988), British writer
Rosemary Tonks (1928-2014), English poet and author
Rosemary Tumusiime (born 1962), Ugandan marketing professional, public administrator, feminist, and politician
Rosemary Turare (born 1964), Papua New Guinean middle-distance runner
Rosemary Uwemedimo, African stories writer of Nigerian origin
Rosemary Valaire (1930-1999), ballet teacher, co-director, and dancer
Rosemary Vandenbroucke (born 1981), Hong Kong-born singer
Rosemary Varty (born 1933), Australian politician
Rosemary Vercoe (1917–2013), British costume designer
Rosemary Verey (1918-2001), English garden designer, lecturer, and prolific garden writer
Rosemary Vodrey, former politician in Manitoba, Canada
Rosemary Vrablic, American banker
Rosemary Waring, honorary reader in human toxicology
Rosemary Watson, American voice over artist, actress, and singer-songwriter
Rosemary Wells (born 1943), American writer and illustrator
Rosemary West (born 1953), English serial killer
Rosemary Willis (born 1953), close witness during U.S. President John F. Kennedy's assassination
Rosemary Willis (Miss Virginia) (born 1990), American beauty pageant titleholder
Rosemary Winslow, American poet, and academic
Rosemary Woolf (1925-1978), English scholar of medieval literature
Rosemary Wyse (born 1957), Scottish astrophysicist and professor in physics and astronomy 
Rosemary Zwick (1925-1995), American printmaker and sculptor

See also

Notes

English feminine given names
Given names derived from plants or flowers